Marcelo Faria Fernandes (born 20 April 1974) is a Brazilian football manager and former player who played as a central defender.

Playing career
Born in Santos, São Paulo, Fernandes played amateur football until his 20s, and began his career at Portuguesa Santista. He moved to Santos in 1991, but after failing to break into the club's starting XI, was loaned to Rio Branco de Americana, Remo, Botafogo-SP, América de Natal and Atlético Mineiro, the last one already in 1998.

Fernandes was released by Peixe in 1999, and returned to Portuguesa Santista. He subsequently returned to América-RN, and then played for Criciúma, Joinville, Náutico, Portuguesa and ABC, retiring with the latter in 2003, aged 32.

Post-playing career
In 2011 Fernandes joined former club Santos' staff, being appointed as assistant manager. On 5 March 2015, after Enderson Moreira's dismissal, he was named interim manager.

On 12 March, after a 2–1 home win against rivals Palmeiras, Fernandes was definitely appointed as manager. On 9 July, after only winning three out of 30 points, he returned to his previous assistant role, being replaced by Dorival Júnior.

In September 2016, after altercations with Dorival, Fernandes was separated from Santos' first team squad. He was also manager of Portuguesa Santista in 2017, after the club reached an agreement with Santos for the loan of certain players, but returned to the club in June of that year.

Fernandes left Peixe in the end of 2017, being subsequently Edson Leivinha's assistant at Corinthians' under-23 squad. In October 2020, he returned to Santos as a permanent assistant coach.

In November 2020, after manager Cuca and other assistants Cuquinha and Eudes Pedro all tested positive for COVID-19, Fernandes was again interim of the main squad. He was an interim in February 2021 after Cuca left, in April 2021 after Ariel Holan resigned, in February 2022 after Fábio Carille was sacked, and in July 2022 after Fabián Bustos was dismissed.

On 27 July 2022, Fernandes left Santos on a mutual agreement.

Career statistics

Managerial statistics

Honours

Player
Remo
Campeonato Paraense: 1993

Manager
Santos
Campeonato Paulista: 2015

References

External links
Meu Time na Rede profile 
Once Onze profile 

1971 births
Living people
Sportspeople from Santos, São Paulo
Brazilian footballers
Campeonato Brasileiro Série A players
Association football defenders
Associação Atlética Portuguesa (Santos) players
Santos FC players
Rio Branco Esporte Clube players
Clube do Remo players
Botafogo Futebol Clube (SP) players
América Futebol Clube (RN) players
Clube Atlético Mineiro players
Rio Branco Atlético Clube players
Criciúma Esporte Clube players
Joinville Esporte Clube players
Clube Náutico Capibaribe players
Associação Portuguesa de Desportos players
ABC Futebol Clube players
Brazilian football managers
Campeonato Brasileiro Série A managers
Santos FC managers
Associação Atlética Portuguesa (Santos) managers
Santos FC non-playing staff